Chokpot is one of the 60 Legislative Assembly constituencies of Meghalaya state in India. It is part of South Garo Hills district and is reserved for candidates belonging to the Scheduled Tribes. It falls under Tura Lok Sabha constituency.

Members of Legislative Assembly
The list of MLAs are given below

Election results

2018

See also
List of constituencies of the Meghalaya Legislative Assembly
 Chokpot
 South Garo Hills district
 Tura (Lok Sabha constituency)

References

Assembly constituencies of Meghalaya
South Garo Hills district